The Circus is the fifth studio album by British pop band Take That. It was released in the United Kingdom on 1 December 2008. The album was their second, and also their last, as a four-piece, as founding member Robbie Williams returned for their sixth studio album Progress (2010), before both Williams and Jason Orange departed prior to the release of 2014's III.

The Circus debuted at number 1 on the UK Albums Chart and was the second best-selling album of 2008 in the UK, selling over 1.5 million copies. The album's lead single "Greatest Day" became Take That's eleventh number one. Four further singles were released which failed to match the success of "Greatest Day": "Up All Night", "The Garden", "Said It All" and "Hold Up a Light".

Release 
In the United Kingdom, the album was released on 1 December 2008, when Britney Spears' sixth album, also titled Circus, released on the same day. Take That's manager said the album's title choice was a coincidence, and that the band had worked "months in advance" and would not be changing the title. He also elaborated: "The boys have worked on this for months, like Britney, and we certainly won't be changing the title", and that "I doubt there will be confusion. Fans will either ask for the new record by Take That or Britney Spears".

Singles
Take That released their first single from the album, "Greatest Day", on 24 November 2008, which peaked at number one in the UK. The second single "Up All Night" was released on 2 March 2009 and peaked at number 14. The third single "The Garden", was released in Germany, the Netherlands and Australia on 20 March 2009, though it also peaked at number 97 in the UK on download sales. The video for the song was shot at the Greenwich Maritime Museum, South London. The fourth single to be taken from the album, "Said It All", was released in June 2009 and peaked at number 9 in the UK. "Hold Up a Light" was the fifth and final single taken from the album, released to promote Take That's first live album The Greatest Day – Take That Present: The Circus Live.

Critical reception 

BBC Music said: "A stunning album, Take That are the vintage champagne of pop fizzing with playful bubbles and happily maturing with age". The Daily Mirror stated that "they bring a fallible human quality to an album which is all about gilding their strong bond with their original fans." The Sunday Mercury said: "Like its predecessor, The Circus boasts one killer track. Hit single Greatest Day is as pop-perfect now as Patience was back in 2006." Yahoo! Music UK stated that "as with its predecessor Beautiful World, The Circus possesses well crafted pop songs, with faultless production".

The Sunday Times stated that "The Circus will, no doubt, achieve similar sales, with songs as propulsive and swollen with giant choruses as The Garden, Greatest Day, Said It All and the apparently Amy Winehouse-referencing "How Did It Come to This". The Times said "Take That's return is the gold standard: a hugely successful second coming from a band determined not to fritter away their reserves of goodwill."

Promotion 
Following the release of the album, Take That announced plans for their first full-length stadium tour titled "Take That Present: The Circus Live" in 2009. The tour became the fastest selling tour in UK history selling £35m of tickets in one day (600,000 in less than 5 hours), beating the previous record set by Michael Jackson for his Bad World Tour in 1987 (though Jackson reclaimed the record soon after when he announced his residency at The O2 Arena in London shortly before his death).
The Script acted as special guests at their performance at Croke Park. Take That also presented their own TV show Take That Come To Town, a variety show where they performed some of their biggest hits and new material from The Circus, which aired on 7 December 2008 on ITV.

To launch the album's release in Paris, the band performed at a lavish nightclub exclusively for the first time in 12 years in the city on 2 December 2008. The performance included acrobats, trapeze artists, stilt-walkers and jugglers, all in keeping with the circus theme.

Commercial performance 
The album reached number one in Ireland and the UK with The Circus selling 133,000 copies on its first day of release in the UK. In the United Kingdom, the album sold 306,000 copies (going platinum) in the first four days of release, making The Circus the fastest-selling album of the year. The album reached the top of the UK album charts on 7 December 2008 with total first-week sales of 432,490, the third highest opening sales week in UK history. The album debuted at #3 on the Irish Albums Chart and a week later rose to number one. On Friday 19 December 2008, the album had sold 1 million copies sold by its 19th day in UK shops, making it the second fastest album in the UK to reach 1 million copies, behind Oasis's Be Here Now in 1997.

The album stayed on top of the UK Albums Chart for five weeks and became one of the biggest selling albums of 2008 in the UK. The album has been certified double platinum in Europe (including the UK and Ireland) for sales in excess of two million copies, and was the 27th best-selling album worldwide in 2008 according to the IFPI. Since its release in December 2008, the album has spent 73 weeks (one year, five months and one week) in the top 100 of the UK Albums Chart.

Track listing

Personnel

Take That 
 Gary Barlow – vocals, acoustic piano, keyboards
 Howard Donald – vocals
 Jason Orange – vocals, acoustic guitar
 Mark Owen – vocals

Musicians 
 John Shanks – keyboards, guitars, bass 
 Ryan Carline – additional keyboards and programming
 Jamie Norton – acoustic piano (11)
 Ben Mark – electric guitar (9)
 Jeff Rothschild – programming, drums
 Wil Malone – string and brass arrangements, conductor
 Perry Montague-Mason – orchestra leader, orchestra director (8)
 London Studio Orchestra – strings and brass
 Mark Nightingale – tenor trombone (1, 8)
 Andy Wood – trombone (1, 8)
 John Barclay – trumpet (1, 8)
 Derek Watkins – trumpet (1, 8)
 Owen Slade – tuba (1, 8)
 Philip Sheppard – cello (5)
 Matthew Ward – violin (5)

Production 
 John Shanks – producer
 Jeff Rothschild – recording, mixing
 Graham Archer – additional engineer
 Ryan Carline – additional engineer
 Richard Lancaster – assistant engineer
 Stephen Marcussen – mastering at Marcussen Mastering (Hollywood, California, USA)
 Shari Sutcliffe – production coordinator
 Studio Fury – art direction, design 
 Rick Guest – photography 
 Jonathan Wild and 10 Management – management

Charts

Weekly charts

Year-end charts

Decade-end charts

Certifications

Release history

References 

Take That albums
2008 albums